The men's 800 metres event at the 1974 British Commonwealth Games was held on 27 and 29 January at the Queen Elizabeth II Park in Christchurch, New Zealand.

Medalists

Results

Heats
Held on 27 January

Qualification: First 4 in each heat (Q) qualify directly for the semifinals.

Semifinals
Held on 27 January

Qualification: First 4 in each semifinal (Q) qualify directly for the final.

Final
Held on 29 January

References

Heats and Semifinals results

Athletics at the 1974 British Commonwealth Games
1974